The Ingrian War between the Swedish Empire and the Tsardom of Russia lasted between 1610 and 1617. It can be seen as part of Russia's Time of Troubles and is mainly remembered for the attempt to put a Swedish duke on the Russian throne. It ended with a large Swedish territorial gain (including Ingria) in the Treaty of Stolbovo, which laid an important foundation to Sweden's Age of Greatness.

Prelude 
During Russia's Time of Troubles, Vasily IV of Russia was besieged in Moscow by the supporters of the second False Dmitry. Driven to despair by the ongoing Polish intervention, he entered into an alliance with Charles IX of Sweden, who was also waging war against Poland. The tsar promised to cede Korela Fortress to Sweden in recompense for military support against False Dmitry II and the Poles. The Swedish commander Jacob de la Gardie joined his forces with the Russian commander Mikhail Skopin-Shuisky and marched from Novgorod towards Moscow in order to relieve the tsar.

Sweden's involvement in Russian affairs gave King Sigismund III Vasa of Poland a pretext to declare war on Russia. The Poles engaged the combined Russo-Swedish forces at the Battle of Klushino and destroyed most of the Russian force. The Swedish mercenaries taking part in the De la Gardie Campaign (July 1610) surrendered. The battle had serious consequences for Russia, as the tsar was deposed by boyars and the Poles occupied the Moscow Kremlin.

War 
In July 1611 a Swedish expeditionary corps under Jacob De la Gardie captured Novgorod. The Novgorodians asked the Swedish king to install one of his sons (Carl Filip or Gustavus Adolphus) as their monarch.

In the meantime, Gustavus Adolphus succeeded to the Swedish throne. The young king decided to press his brother's claim to the Russian throne even after the Poles had been expelled from Moscow by a patriotic uprising in 1612 and Mikhail Romanov had been elected the new tsar.
He was the first tsar of the House of Romanov.

While the Swedish statesmen envisaged the creation of a Trans-Baltic dominion extending northwards to Archangelsk and eastwards to Vologda, De la Gardie and other Swedish soldiers, still holding Novgorod and Ingria, saw the war as a reaction for their forces not receiving payment for their succour during the De la Gardie Campaign.

In 1613, the Swedish troops advanced towards Tikhvin and laid siege to the city but were repelled. The Russian counteroffensive failed to regain Novgorod, however. The Russian tsar refused to commit his troops to battle, and the war lumbered on until 1614 when the Swedes captured Gdov.

The following year, they laid siege to Pskov but Russian Generals Morozov and Buturlin held their own until 27 February 1617 when the Treaty of Stolbovo stripped Russia of its access to the Baltic Sea and awarded to Sweden the province of Ingria with the townships of Ivangorod, Jama, Koporye, and Noteborg. Novgorod and Gdov were to be restored to Russia.

As a result of the war, Russia was denied access to the Baltic sea for about a century, despite its persistent efforts to reverse the situation. That led to the increased importance of Arkhangelsk for its trading connections with Western Europe.

References

Citations

Sources

Further reading

 Göransson, Göte (1994) Gustav II Adolf och hans folk. Höganäs: Bra böcker 

1610s conflicts
Ingria
Invasions of Russia
Wars involving Russia
Wars involving Sweden
1610s in Sweden
1610s in Russia
1610 in Russia
1610 in Sweden
Russia–Sweden military relations
Time of Troubles